Vladimirovca (Volodymyrivka, Vladimirovskiy) is a commune in the Slobozia District of Transnistria, Moldova. It is composed of three villages: Constantinovca (Костянтинівка, Константиновка), Nicolscoe (Нікольське, Никольское) and Vladimirovca. It has since 1990 been administered as a part of the breakaway Transnistrian Moldovan Republic.

References

Communes of Transnistria
Slobozia District